Thallium(I) fluoride is the inorganic compound with the formula TlF. It is a white solid, forming orthorhombic crystals. The solid slightly deliquescent. It has a distorted sodium chloride (rock salt) crystal structure, due to the 6s2 inert pair on Tl+.

This salt is unusual among the thallium(I) halides in that it is very soluble in water.

Reactions
Thallium(I) fluoride can be prepared by the reaction of thallium(I) carbonate with hydrofluoric acid.

References

Thallium(I) compounds
Fluorides
Metal halides